Didier Le Gac is a French politician representing La République En Marche! and Territories of Progress. He was elected to the French National Assembly on 18 June 2017, representing the 3rd constituency of the department of Finistère.

See also
 2017 French legislative election

References

Year of birth missing (living people)
Living people
La République En Marche! politicians
Territories of Progress politicians
Deputies of the 15th National Assembly of the French Fifth Republic
Deputies of the 16th National Assembly of the French Fifth Republic